St Xavier's College, Marawila is a boys public national school in Puttalam District, Sri Lanka.

See also
 List of schools in North Western Province, Sri Lanka
 List of Jesuit sites

References

External links
 St. Xavier's College
 
 

1942 establishments in Ceylon
Boys' schools in Sri Lanka
Educational institutions established in 1942
National schools in Sri Lanka
Schools in Puttalam District